Diabigue is a small town and commune in the Cercle of Nioro du Sahel in the Kayes Region of south-western Mali. In 1998 the commune had a population of 16107.

References

Communes of Kayes Region